Max Nonnenbruch (25 January 1857 – 13 March 1922) was a German painter from the Munich School, a group mostly known for their Neoclassicism and Symbolism scenes.

Gallery

References

External links

Some paintings of Max Nonnenbruch in artnet

1857 births
1922 deaths
19th-century German painters
19th-century German male artists
20th-century German painters
20th-century German male artists
German male painters
People from Viersen